La gran familia  is a 1962 Spanish classic comedy film directed by  and starring Alberto Closas and Amparo Soler Leal, as a married couple with 15 children, José Isbert and José Luis López Vázquez.

Plot
Carlos (Alberto Closas) has to work to feed his wife (Amparo Soler Leal), his 15 children and the grandpa (José Isbert). The children dream off having a television. The summer holidays is another trouble for the big family.

Cast
 Alberto Closas as Carlos Alonso
 Amparo Soler Leal as Mercedes Cebrián
 José Isbert as the grandfather
 José Luis López Vázquez as the godfather
 María José Alfonso
 Jaime Blanch
 
 Maribel Martín
 
 Julia Gutiérrez Caba
 María Isbert
 Jesús Álvarez
 Luis Barbero
 Jesús Guzmán
 
 Valentín Tornos
 
 José María Caffarel
 Laly Soldevila
 José María Prada

References

External links
 

1962 films
1960s Spanish-language films
Spanish black-and-white films
1962 comedy-drama films
Spain in fiction
Madrid in fiction
Films with screenplays by Rafael J. Salvia
Spanish comedy films
1960s Spanish films